

See also
 Science and technology in Iran
 Iran National Science Foundation
 List of universities in Iran

External links
Scientific advances of Iranians 
Perspective of Science in Iran
The contribution of Iranian scientists to world civilization
The medical sciences in the Avesta
Iranian science: Iran's Scientists Cautiously Reach Out to the World
Discipline-Wise Index of Leading Scientists and Engineers of OIC

References 

Education in Iran
 
Iran education-related lists
Economy of Iran